Gabourey Sidibe (born May 6, 1983) is an American actress. She made her acting debut in the 2009 film Precious, a role that earned her the Independent Spirit Award for Best Female Lead, in addition to nominations for the Golden Globe and Academy Award for Best Actress. Her other film roles include Tower Heist (2011), White Bird in a Blizzard (2014), Grimsby (2016), and Antebellum (2020).

From 2010 to 2013, she was a main cast member of the Showtime series The Big C. Sidibe co-starred in the television series American Horror Story arcs Coven (2013–2014) as Queenie and Freak Show (2014–2015) as Regina Ross, and later reprised her role as Queenie in Hotel (2015–2016) and Apocalypse (2018). From 2015 to 2020, she starred in the Fox musical drama series Empire as Becky Williams.

Early life
Sidibe was born in New York City in the Bedford–Stuyvesant, Brooklyn neighborhood, and was raised in Harlem. Her mother, Alice Tan Ridley, is an American R&B and gospel singer who appeared on the fifth season of America's Got Talent, on June 15, 2010. Her father, Ibnou Sidibe, is from Senegal and is a cab driver. Growing up, Sidibe lived with her aunt, feminist activist Dorothy Pitman Hughes. She holds an associate degree from Borough of Manhattan Community College and attended but did not graduate from City College of New York and Mercy College. She worked at The Fresh Air Fund's office as a receptionist before pursuing an acting career.

Career
In Precious, Sidibe played the main character, Claireece "Precious" Jones, a 16-year-old mother of two (the result of Precious being raped by her father) who tries to escape abuse at the hands of her mother. The film won numerous awards, including two Academy Awards, a Golden Globe Award, and Sundance Film Festival Grand Jury Award. On December 15, 2009, she was nominated for a Golden Globe in the category of Best Performance by an Actress in a Motion Picture Drama for her performance in Precious. The next month she received an Academy Award nomination for Best Actress.

Her next film, Yelling to the Sky, was a Sundance Lab project directed by Victoria Mahoney and starring Zoe Kravitz, in which she played Latonya Williams, a bully. In 2011, Sidibe was in the film Tower Heist and voiced a character in "Hot Water", the first episode of season 7 of American Dad! She appeared in the season 8 American Dad! episode "Stanny Tendergrass" early in 2013, and starred in the music video for "Don't Stop (Color on the Walls)" by the indie pop band Foster the People. Sidibe also appeared in the Showtime network series The Big C as Andrea Jackson.

Sidibe said in 2012 that before she was hired for the 2009 film Precious, she was advised by Joan Cusack not to pursue the entertainment industry, advising Sidibe to quit the business since "it's so image-conscious."

By April 2013, Sidibe had joined the cast of American Horror Story season 3, portraying Queenie, a young witch. She returned to the series for its fourth season, American Horror Story: Freak Show as a secretarial school student, Regina Ross. From 2015, she stars in Lee Daniels' Fox musical series Empire as Becky Williams alongside Terrence Howard and Taraji P. Henson. Sidibe portrays the head of A&R in the Empire company. As of April 2015, Sidibe was promoted to a series regular in season 2. She also starred in the Hulu series Difficult People as Denise.

In 2015, publisher Houghton Mifflin Harcourt announced Sidibe would be writing a memoir set to be published in 2017. On January 6, 2016, Sidibe appeared in the penultimate episode of American Horror Story: Hotel, reprising her Coven role as Queenie, marking her third season in the series. After sitting out subsequent seasons Roanoke and Cult, Sidibe returned to American Horror Story in 2018, appearing once again as her character Queenie in its eighth season, Apocalypse.

Personal life
In March 2017, Sidibe revealed that she had been diagnosed with type 2 diabetes and that as a consequence she underwent laparoscopic bariatric surgery in an effort to manage her weight.

In November 2020, Sidibe announced her engagement to  Brandon Frankel, a talent manager with Cameo. The couple married in March 2021.

Filmography

Film

Television

Music videos
 Foster the People: "Don't Stop (Color on the Walls)" (2011)
 Channing Tatum and Jamie Foxx: "(I Wanna) Channing All Over Your Tatum" (2014)

Awards and nominations

Bibliography

See also 
 List of black Academy Award winners and nominees
 List of black Golden Globe Award winners and nominees

References

External links 

 

1983 births
Living people
Actresses from New York City
American people of Senegalese descent
Independent Spirit Award for Best Female Lead winners
Mercy College (New York) alumni
People from Bedford–Stuyvesant, Brooklyn
People from Harlem
21st-century American actresses
American television actresses
African-American actresses
American film actresses
American voice actresses
Washington Irving High School (New York City) alumni
Borough of Manhattan Community College alumni
21st-century African-American women
21st-century African-American people
20th-century African-American people
20th-century African-American women